Groenendael Priory (meaning, "green valley"; alternate, Gruenendale) is located in the Forest of Soignes in the municipality of Hoeilaart in the Flemish Brabant, about  southeast of Brussels, Belgium.

History
Duchess Jeanne of Brabant had allotted the forest land to the Priory and also to many other monasteries in the region. In 1304, an old shooting lodge of Jean II was given to a hermit on condition that after he died, it would go to another religious person who was serving God.

Following this, a community was established at the site around 1343 by three canons who had left St. Michael and St. Gudula Cathedral in Brussels seeking space outside the city, John of Ruysbroeck, Jan Hinckaert and Frank van Coudenberg, which on 13 March 1349 became formalised as a monastery of Augustinian canons. Coudenberg became the first provost and Ruysbroeck the first prior. Their association with the canonical order of St. Augustine was very loose, despite attempts by the Augustinian abbey of Abbey of St. Victor, Paris. Their revenue included selling wood, as well as bequests an legacies. (It is possible that the cause of Ruysbroeck's leaving Brussels was that he was persecuted for his attack on a woman known as Bloemardinne who was propagating false tenets in Netherlands; he had countered it with his own set of pamphlets.)

The monastery became famous during the late fourteenth century largely on account of Ruysbroeck's reputation as a spiritual guide and writer, with many people travelling to Groenendaal to visit him. After Ruysbroeck's death in 1381, his relics were preserved at the monastery.

The importance of Groenendaal during the late fourteenth century was not just on account of the community that formed there, but also for the writings which resulted and had a large influence on later spiritual and mystical thought. This was particularly so in the case of the writings of Ruysbroeck. The work and thought of other members of the Groenendaal community, including Willem Jordaens (c1310-1372), who lived at Groenendaal from 1353 until his death, Jan van Leeuwen (c1310-1378), Godeverd van Wevele (c1320-1396) and Jan van Schoonhoven, has also been increasingly studied in recent years. The works of these writers received some attention at the time, especially among Dutch readers.

Groenendaal's life as an independent monastery did not last long, however. The religious group continued in the late fourteenth and early fifteenth centuries, with a religious choir, without lay brothers. The necrology includes the names of the brothers. The monks lived on the produce from their estate, which included orchards, a nursery, and kitchen gardens. The Benedictine nuns of the forest lived next to the priory.

On 7 May 1413, the independent house of Augustinian canons at Groenendaal was absorbed into the Windesheim congregation of the Devotio Moderna. Groenendael lost the title of monastery and became a priory, which was rebuilt and enlarged between 1450 and 1500.

In 1520, Philip of Cleves erected a palace near the monastic buildings which often served as hunting accommodations for Charles V; the Infanta Isabella stayed there frequently and also contributed to its embellishment.

By the late eighteenth century, the site had lost its use. It was referred to as a 'useless convent' in 1784; the church and other buildings were sold by Joseph II and demolished three years later in 1787. The furniture was scattered. An attempt to restore the priory by the Council of Brabant in 1790) failed with the arrival of the French. A coup de grace occurred in 1796. Charles V frequently came to Groenendael with other royalty to indulge in the sport of hunting. A banquet occurred here at the end of a hunting party which brought together Charles V, Philip II, Eleanor widow of Francois I, Mary of Hungary, Ferdinand of Austria and his wife, and Mulay Hassan, former king of Tunis.

Ruysbroeck's relics, which were preserved at the Priory until 1783, were taken to Brussels on the demolition of the priory, only to be lost during the French Revolution.

Architecture and fittings
A chapel with two altars, which were built by Ruysbroeck, Coudenberg, Hinckaert, and Jan van Affinghem (the cook), was consecrated in March 1344. The cloister is characterized by arched windows in a building, which is otherwise simple in construction. The prior's house was built in 1783, shortly before the final closing of the priory, and it was restored in 2009. The scriptorium was built shortly after 1435, abandoned in the early sixteenth century after the rise of the water table, and re-discovered in 2005. The room and its preserved architecture are unique examples of medieval architecture; it is in need of restoration. The laundry room, built in 1743, was converted into a ranger house in the nineteenth century. The nave of the church was converted. The barn, which was built after 1777, now serves as the Bosmuseum "Jan van Ruusbroec" (Museum of the Sonian Forest). A water mill, built in 1662 along the river was transformed into a house during the second half of the eighteenth century. There are terraced gardens located on the southern slope behind the nave of the church. Some of the church furniture was reused in area churches. The main altar is from Herfelingen and other are from Erps-Kwerps. The stalls were made in Vilvoorde. The confessionals are from Wezembeek. The Bishop of Cambrai was benefactor of Groenendael's monastic library.

The remains of the former priory are protected since 1998.

References

Christian monasteries in Flemish Brabant
Augustinian monasteries in Belgium
Hoeilaart

es:Priorato de Groenendael#top